Eutaw Place Temple is a large, eclectically-styled former synagogue on Eutaw Place in the Bolton Hill neighborhood of Baltimore, Maryland. The temple was constructed to serve the German Jewish immigrant community. Originally built as a synagogue for the Temple Oheb Shalom congregation, the property was sold to the Prince Hall Masons in 1960. It was built in 1892 as the second home of the Oheb Shalom congregation, and borrows design elements from the Great Synagogue of Florence. The architect was Joseph Evans Sperry of Baltimore.

The exterior is white Beaver Dam marble. The main space is roughly  square, capped by a series of vaults and the dome and surrounded by galleries, seating about 2,200 people. The temple originally cost $225,000 to build.

The Eutaw Place Temple is a major contributing structure in the Bolton Hill Historic District.

See also
 Baltimore Hebrew Congregation Synagogue, of similar scale and character, a few blocks to the northwest of the Eutaw Place Temple

Related Links 
 Most Worshipful Prince Hall Grand Lodge of Maryland
 Eutaw Place Temple – Explore Baltimore Heritage

References

Bolton Hill, Baltimore
German-Jewish culture in Baltimore
Synagogues completed in 1892
Synagogue buildings with domes
Byzantine Revival synagogues
Prince Hall Freemasonry
Former synagogues in Maryland
Synagogues in Baltimore
Joseph Evans Sperry buildings
Baltimore National Heritage Area
Historic district contributing properties in Maryland
Synagogues on the National Register of Historic Places in Maryland
National Register of Historic Places in Baltimore
Reform synagogues in Maryland